A Velox boiler is a high pressure, forced circulation, water-tube boiler. It was developed in 1930s by Brown Boveri Company of Switzerland. The first public demonstration of Velox was at VDI Scientific Conference in Berlin on 15 October 1932.

Design

Velox principle
From Brown Boveri Review

Working
Velox boiler is based on the principle that heat transfer rate increases when velocity of flue gas is more than speed of sound. This increases steam generation rate.
Flue gases are used to turn a turbine which is connected to the compressor. It increases the flow of hot air to or above the speed of sound. This increases the rate of heat transfer to the water coming from the economizer into the boiler tubes causing more steam to generate which then goes into a superheater via a steam separator. Steam from superheater is at high temperature and pressure. This is used to operate turbines.

Components 
 Water feed pump
 Economizer for water preheating
 Hot water circulating pump
 Tube evaporating section
 Turbine
 Compressor
 Steam separator
 Superheater

Uses
Velox boiler was primarily marketed for electricity generation. They were anticipated to be used in steam locomotives on land as well as on sea but eventually lost to efficiency and cost effectiveness of supercharged diesel engine and constant pressure combustion gas turbine. Advantages of somewhat reduced weight and purely rotary motion were greatly offset by the fact that Velox boilers were little over half efficient compared to diesel engines.

Advantages:

 Compact design.
 Flexibility of design.
 High combustion rate.
 It can be quickly started.

Disadvantages:

Requires additional parts
 Electric starter.
 Gas turbine to drive air compressor.
 Steam turbine for water circulation.

References 

Steam boiler types